The 2018 MAC Championship Game was an NCAA Division I college football conference championship game for the Mid-American Conference (MAC), that was played on November 30, 2018. It was the 22nd Mid-American Conference Championship, and was played at Ford Field in Detroit, Michigan. Sponsored by the Marathon Petroleum Corporation, the game was officially known as the Marathon MAC Championship Game. Northern Illinois scored the game's final 20 points to erase a 19-point second-half deficit and defeat Buffalo, 30–29.

Teams

Northern Illinois Huskies

Northern Illinois went undefeated 6-0 in conference play, until the Huskies lost to Miami on November 14. The Huskies were able to clinch the West Division, after the last remaining contender, Western Michigan, lost their third conference game also that weekend, eliminating the Broncos from contention. Northern Illinois makes their first appearance in the title game since 2015.

Buffalo Bulls

Buffalo was able to clinch the East Division after defeating the Falcons of Bowling Green at the end of the season, compelling a conference record of 7-1. The Bulls make their first appearance in the game since 2008.

Buffalo vs. Northern Illinois series history
The match up was the 13th meeting against the Bulls and the Huskies. They last played each other last season in Amherst, New York. Northern Illinois defeated Buffalo in a close win of 14-13. After the 2016 match up, Northern Illinois lead the series, 11-1. Buffalo has not won against the Huskies since 1968. The championship game was the first time in history that the two schools played in post season.

Game summary

Scoring summary

Statistics

References

Championship Game
MAC Championship Game
Buffalo Bulls football games
Northern Illinois Huskies football games
American football competitions in Detroit
MAC Championship Game
MAC Championship
MAC Championship